This is an alphabetic list of deputy members of the Norwegian Storting.

A

 John Aalmo (1902–1981), term/s: 1954–1957 and 1958–1961
 Tolv Aamland (1893–1983), term/s: 1945–1949
 Hallvard Aamlid (born 1973), term/s: 1997–2001
 Torhild Aarbergsbotten (born 1969), term/s: 2009–2013 and 2013–2017
 Hans Aardal (1921–1995), term/s: 1965–1969 and 1969–1973
 John-Ragnar Aarset (born 1973), term/s: 2001–2005 and 2005–2009
 Wilhelm Aarstad (1854–?)
 Olaf Aarvold (1899–1991), term/s: 1950–1953, 1954–1957, and 1958–1961
 Johan Aas (born 1960)
 Olav Aase (1914–1992), term/s: 1945–1949
 Elisabeth Aasen (1922–2009), term/s: 1973–1977
 Erling Aas-Eng (born 1965), term/s: 1993–1997
 Ann-Mari Aasland (1915–2008), term/s: 1973–1977
 Per Aasness (1875–1959)
 Rigmor Aasrud (born 1960), term/s: 1993–1997, 1997–2001 and 2001–2005
 Karima Abd-Daif (born 1965), term/s: 2005–2009
 Olaug Abrahamsen (1928–2010), term/s: 1977–1981
 Merete Agerbak-Jensen (born 1967), term/s: 1993–1997 and 1997–2001
 Knut Andreas Pettersen Agersborg (1765–1847), term/s: 1824–1826
 Svein Olav Agnalt (born 1949), term/s: 1977–1981
 Bernt Albert (born 1944), term/s: 1969–1973
 Ellen Alfsen (born 1965), term/s: 2001–2005 and 2005–2009
 Gabriel Ålgård (1952–2015), term/s: 1977–1981
 Athar Ali (born 1961), term/s: 1993–1997
 Kolbjørn Almlid (born 1945), term/s: 1989–1993
 Aud Alvær (1921–2000), term/s: 1969–1973
 Torkil Åmland (born 1966), term/s: 2009–2013
 Asle Amundsen (born 1952), term/s: 1985–1989
 Gry-Anette Rekanes Amundsen (born 1973)
 Randi Anda (1898–1999), term/s: 1954-57, 1958–61, 1961–65 and 1965-69
 Johannes Andenæs (1912–2003), term/s: 1958–1961
 Erik Andersen (born 1937), term/s: 1989–1993, 1993–1997 and 2001–2005
 Ingvald Anker Andersen (1866–1950), term/s: 1922–1924
 Rolf Andersen (1916–1990), term/s: 1969–1973
 Rolf Erling Andersen (1947–2021), term/s: 1997–2001 and 2001–2005
 Reidun Andersson (1922–1992), term/s: 1981–1985
 Peter Martin Anker (1801–1863)
 Åshild Anmarkrud (born 1939), term/s: 1997–2001
 Åsmund Apeland (1930–2010), term/s: 1969–1973
 Ola S. Apeland (born 1964), term/s: 1989–1993 and 1993–1997
 Johan Arndt (1876–1933), term/s: 1913–1915
 Stein Åros (1952–1996), term/s: 1981–1985, 1985–1989 and 1989–1993
 Eilif Åsbo (1905–1973)
 Nils Asheim (1895–1966), term/s: 1945–1949
 Olav Askvik (1915–2011), term/s: 1965–1969
 Jørgen Åsland (born 1946), term/s: 1993–1997
 Lars Aspeflaten (1924–2010), term/s: 1954–1957
 John Ole Aspli (born 1956), term/s: 2005–2009
 Steinar Aspli (born 1957), term/s: 1997–2001
 Åsmund Grøver Aukrust (born 1985)
 Eva Vinje Aurdal (born 1957)
 Olaf Aurdal (born 1939), term/s: 1989–1993
 Siri Austeng (1944–2017), term/s: 1985–1989

B

 Eystein Bærug (1923–1998), term/s: 1973–1977
 Johnny Bakke (1908–1979), term/s: 1954–1957, 1958–1961, 1961–1965 and 1965–1969
 Alf Bakken (born 1962), term/s: 1989–1993
 Inger Marie Bakken (born 1951), term/s: 1981–1985
 Jon Bakken (born 1943), term/s: 1985–1989, 1989–1993 and 1993–1997
 Inga Balstad (born 1952), term/s: 1993–1997 and 1997–2001
 Leif Georg Ferdinand Bang (1881– ??), term/s: 1922–1924
 Inge Bartnes (born 1970), term/s: 1997–2001
 Une Aina Bastholm (born 1986), term/s: 2013–2017
 August Christian Baumann (1770–1831)
 Jens Tolv Beck (1890–1939)
 Astrid Bekkenes (born 1947), term/s: 2005–2009
 Målfrid Floan Belbo (born 1927), term/s: 1969–1973 and 1973–1977
 Vigdis Hjulstad Belbo (born 1955), term/s: 1993–1997 and 1997–2001
 Ivar Belck-Olsen (born 1932), term/s: 1977–1981, 1981–1985 and 1985–1989
 Bertha Bele (1893–1967), term/s: 1945-1949 and 1950-1953
 Gerd Benneche (1913–2003), term/s: 1958–1961
 Amund Nøkleby Bentzen (1903–1969), term/s: 1945–1949
 Jarle Benum (born 1928), term/s: 1965–1969, 1969–1973 and 1973–1977
 Gunnar Berg (died 2007), term/s: 1965–1969
 Klara Berg (1925–2011), term/s: 1981–1985 and 1985–1989
 Ronny Berg (born 1970), term/s: 2013–2017
 Anne Sofie Berge (born 1937), term/s: 1997–2001
 Frode Berge (born 1966), term/s: 1993–1997 and 2005–2009
 Hilde Bergebakken (born 1963), term/s: 1993–1997
 Gerd Olaug Berger (1915–2008), term/s: 1965–1969
 Ellen Bergli (born 1945), term/s: 1997–2001
 Bjarne Berg-Sæther (1919–2009)
 Kirsti Bergstø (born 1981), term/s: 2005–2009
 Arne Bergsvåg (born 1958), term/s: 2005–2009 and 2009–2013
 Kjartan Berland (born 1972)
 Oddvar Berrefjord (1918–1999), term/s: 1965–1969 and 1969–1973
 Pål Berrefjord (born 1977), term/s: 2001–2005
 Ola Bertelsen (1864–1946), term/s: 1931–1933
 Sindre Fossum Beyer (born 1977), term/s: 2005–2009
 Lars T. Bjella (1922–2013), term/s: 1950–1953, 1965–1969, 1969–1973 and 1973–1977
 Olaf Bjerke (1893–1957), term/s: 1954–1957
 Siri Bjerke (1958–2012)
 Olav Bjørkum (1859–1936), term/s: 1900–1903
 Nils Bjørnflaten (born 1942), term/s: 1985–1989
 Sten Egil Bjørnø (born 1946), term/s: 1985–1989
 Helge Bjørnsen (born 1954), term/s: 1997–2001 and 2001–2005
 Asbjørn Bjørnset (born 1938), term/s: 1973–1977, 1981–1985, 1985–1989 and 1989–1993
 Marianne S. Bjorøy (born 1962), term/s: 2013–2017
 Trond Henry Blattmann (born 1964), term/s: 2013–2017
 Birger Blom-Kalstø (1940–2011), term/s: 1969–1973 and 1977–1981
 Anne Marie Blomstereng (born 1940), term/s: 1989–1993
 Marion Gunstveit Bojanowski (born 1966), term/s: 2009–2013
 Carl Christian Bonnevie (1849–1917)
 Kristine Bonnevie (1872–1948)
 Eivind N. Borge (born 1950), term/s: 2005–2009
 Marianne Borgen (born 1951), term/s: 1989–1993, 1993–1997, 1997–2001 and 2001–2005
 Torstein Børte (1899–1985), term/s: 1958–1961
 Amund Braaten (1849–1919)
 Ola Skjåk Bræk (1912–1999), term/s: 1965–1969 and 1973–1977
 Tone Heimdal Brataas (born 1970)
 Johannes Bråten (1920–1997), term/s: 1965–1969 and 1969–1973
 Sylvi Bratten (born 1973), term/s: 1993–1997
 Arne Braut (born 1950), term/s: 2001–2005
 Johannes Brecke (1877–1943), term/s: 1922–1924 and 1925–1927
 Ruth Lilian Brekke (born 1938), term/s: 2001–2005
 Cathrin Bretzeg (born 1965), term/s: 2005–2009
 Lorentz Brinch (1910–1953), term/s: 1945–1949
 Jens Arnfinn Brødsjømoen (born 1958), term/s: 1993–1997 and 1997–2001
 Anton Wilhelm Brøgger (1884–1951), term/s: 1928–1930
 Hans Kristian Bromstad (1903–1971), term/s: 1958–1961 and 1961–1965
 Rolf Jarle Brøske (born 1980), term/s: 2001–2005 and 2005–2009
 Gunnar Brøvig (1924–1965), term/s: 1961–1965
 Harald Nikolai Brøvig (1917–2010), term/s: 1958–1961 and 1965–1969
 Anders Trulsson Bruland (1770–1818), term/s: 1815–1816
 Johan Christopher Brun (1838–1914), term/s: 1895–1897
 Kirsten Brunvoll (1895–1976), term/s: 1945–1949 and 1950–1953
 Anette Wiig Bryn (born 1964), term/s: 2005–2009
 Axel Buch (1930–1998), term/s: 1977–1981 and 1981–1985
 Hans Gabriel Nissen Buck (1848–1924), term/s: 1916–1918
 Sverre Bugge (born 1953), term/s: 2005–2009
 Vivian Knarvik Bugge (born 1960), term/s: 1997–2001
 Tove Billington Bye, term/s: 1973–1977 and 1977–1981
 Vegard Bye (born 1951), term/s: 1993–1997
 Astrid Aarhus Byrknes (born 1963), term/s: 2009–2013 and 2013–2017
 Ola Byrknes (born 1933), term/s: 1973–1977

C

 Andreas Zeier Cappelen (1915–2008), term/s: 1961–1965
 Didrik Cappelen (1900–1970)
 Olav Sigurd Carlsen (1930–2013), term/s: 1973–1977
 Christen Christensen (1826–1900)
 Julius Christensen (1840–1923), term/s: 1907–1909 and 1913–1915
 Hans Langsted Christie (1826–1907), term/s: 1880–1882
 Hartvig Caspar Christie (1826–1873)
 Sara Stockfleth Christie (1857–1948), term/s: 1916–1918 and 1919–1921
 Isak Kobro Collett (1867–1911), term/s: 1910–1912
 Wenche Cumming (born 1944)

D

 Per Kristian Dahl (born 1960), term/s: 2005–2009
 Torgeir Dahl (born 1953), term/s: 2009–2013
 Jon Georg Dale (born 1984), term/s: 2009–2013 and 2013–2017
 Birgit Dalland (1907–2007), term/s: 1945–1949
 Erling Danielsen (1922–2010), term/s: 1965–1969 and 1969–1973
 Jens Peter Debes (1776–1832)
 Kristin K. Devold (born 1939), term/s: 1989–1993
 Arnt Dolven (1892–1954)
 Morten Drægni (born 1983), term/s: 2005–2009 and 2009–2013
 Jørun Drevland (born 1944), term/s: 1993–1997
 Bodil Skjånes Dugstad (born 1927), term/s: 1973–1977
 Gerd Dvergsdal (born 1946), term/s: 2001–2005
 Nils S. Dvergsdal (1842–1921)

E

 Jørgen Tandberg Ebbesen (1812–1887), term/s: 1877–1879
 Richard Edvardsen (born 1936), term/s: 1993–1997
 Einar Westye Egeberg Sr. (1851–1940), term/s: 1892–1894
 Lars Egeland (born 1957), term/s: 2001–2005, 2005–2009 and 2009–2013
 John Eggen (1885– ??), term/s: 1931–1933
 Siri Hov Eggen (born 1969), term/s: 2001–2005 and 2009–2013
 Magnhild Eia (born 1960), term/s: 1993–1997, 1997–2001, 2001–2005 and 2005–2009
 Gunn-Vivian Eide (born 1964), term/s: 1997–2001
 Kai Eide (born 1949), term/s: 1993–1997
 Johan Lauritz Eidem (died 1984), term/s: 1950–1953
 Arnljot Karstein Eidnes (1909–1990), term/s: 1961–1965 and 1965–1969
 Andreas E. Eidsaa (born 1970), term/s: 1993–1997
 Bjarte Eikeset (1937–2017), term/s: 1981–1985 and 1985–1989
 Terje Østebø Eikin (born 1975), term/s: 2013–2017
 Nina Eik-Nes (1900–1997), term/s: 1945–1949 and 1950–1953
 Kai Ekanger (born 1929), term/s: 1997–2001
 Jens Petter Ekornes (1942–2008), term/s: 2001–2005
 Arne Konrad Eldegard (born 1917), term/s: 1965–1969
 John Christian Elden (born 1967), term/s: 2013–2017
 Gunnar Ellefsen (1930–1997)
 Ludvig Ellefsrød (1894–1983), term/s: 1950–1953, 1954–1957 and 1958–1961
 Geir Elsebutangen (born 1964)
 Johan Elsness (born 1947)
 Ola Elvestuen (born 1967), term/s: 2001–2005, 2005–2009 and 2009–2013
 Jakob Eng (born 1937)
 Knut Engdahl (born 1933), term/s: 1977–1981
 Siri Engesæth (born 1969), term/s: 2013–2017
 Ann-Kristin Engstad (born 1982), term/s: 2005–2009
 Eldrid Erdal (1901–1997), term/s: 1961–1965
 Kjell Erfjord (born 1940), term/s: 1981–1985, 1985–1989 and 1989–1993
 Egil Werner Erichsen (1901–2000), term/s: 1954–1957
 Aud Voss Eriksen (born 1937)
 Ellen Eriksen (born 1972), term/s: 2009–2013 and 2013–2017
 Even Erlien (born 1955), term/s: 1993–1997 and 1997–2001
 Harald Espelund (born 1948), term/s: 2001–2005
 Carl Peter Parelius Essendrop (1818–1893)
 Per Egil Evensen (born 1950), term/s: 2005–2009

F

 Wilhelm Hansen Færden (1852–1923)
 Hans Lindahl Falck (1863–1937), term/s: 1895–1897
 Lucie Paus Falck (born 1938), term/s: 1989–1993
 Jonas Cornelius Falk (1844–1915), term/s: 1898–1900
 Arne Falstad (1874–1958)
 Elisabeth Fanghol (born 1983)
 Ludvig Hope Faye (1931–2017), term/s: 1977–1981
 Elisabet Fidjestøl (born 1922), term/s: 1969–1973 and 1973–1977
 Kristian Mathias Fimland (1889– ??), term/s: 1950–1953
 Ingrid Fiskaa (born 1977), term/s: 1997–2001, 2001–2005 and 2009–2013
 Kleiv Fiskvik (born 1943), term/s: 1989–1993
 Ottar Fjærvoll (1914–1995), term/s: 1954–1957
 Eirik Langeland Fjeld (born 1973), term/s: 1997–2001
 Oddvar Flæte (born 1944), term/s: 1977–1981
 Gunn Elin Flakne (born 1964)
 Bertel Flaten (1900–1963), term/s: 1954–1957 and 1958–1961
 Roar Flåthen (born 1950), term/s: 1985–1989
 Odd Flattum (born 1942), term/s: 1981–1985 and 1985–1989
 Elise Fliflet (1893–1991), term/s: 1945–1949
 Reidar Floeng (1918–2014), term/s: 1961–1965
 Helen Fløisand (born 1952), term/s: 1993–1997 and 1997–2001
 Ragna Flotve (born 1960), term/s: 2001–2005
 Gunnar Fløystad (1902–1977), term/s: 1961–1965
 Aud Folkestad (born 1953), term/s: 1997–2001
 Nils Tore Føreland (born 1957), term/s: 1981–1985, 1985–1989 and 1993–1997
 Thor Erik Forsberg (born 1980)
 Åse Fosli (1924–2009), term/s: 1977–1981 and 1981–1985
 Ingunn Foss (born 1960), term/s: 2005–2009
 Jon Fossum (1923–2007), term/s: 1965–1969
 Brit Fougner (born 1946), term/s: 1989–1993
 Kitty Petrine Fredriksen (1910–2003), term/s: 1945–1949 and 1950–1953
 Nicolai Friis (1815–1888), term/s: 1862–1863
 Andreas Frivåg (1925–1991), term/s: 1977–1981
 Torbjørn Frøysnes (born 1946), term/s: 1989–1993
 Erlend Fuglum (born 1978), term/s: 2005–2009 and 2009–2013

G

 Hans Gaare (1905–1993), term/s: 1961–1965, 1965–1969 and 
 Andreas Bernhard Gamst (born 1923), term/s: 1969–1973
 Torgeir Garmo (born 1941), term/s: 1981–1985
 Jens Gasmann (1776–1850)
 Monica Gåsvatn (born 1968), term/s: 2017–2021
 Gerhard Meidell Gerhardsen (1885–1931)
 Masud Gharahkhani (born 1982)
 Helga Gitmark (1929–2008), term/s: 1977–1981
 Arne Gjedrem (1890–1978), term/s: 1945–1949
 Arvid Gjengedal (born 1943), term/s: 1985–1989
 Bjartmar Gjerde (1931–2009), term/s: 1965–1969
 Gunn Berit Gjerde (born 1954), term/s: 2005–2009
 John Gjerde (born 1929), term/s: 1977–1981
 Rolf Gjermundsen (1921–1994), term/s: 1969–1973 and 1973–1977
 Kari Gløersen (born 1948), term/s: 1997–2001 and 2001–2005
 Arnulf Goksøyr (born 1963), term/s: 2013–2017
 Per M. Goverud (1905–1976), term/s: 1958–1961
 Sylvi Graham (born 1951), term/s: 2005–2009
 Thora Grahl-Nielsen (1901–1976), term/s: 1950–1953, 1954–1957 and 1958–1961
 Gudbrand Granum (1893–1984), term/s: 1945–1949
 Knut Gravråk (born 1985), term/s: 2005–2009
 Rachel Grepp (1879–1961)
 Thorvald Gressum (1932–2008), term/s: 1977–1981
 Åslaug Grinde (born 1931), term/s: 1969–1973
 Alf Grindrud (1904–1959), term/s: 1945–1949
 Ole Henrik Grønn (born 1984), term/s: 2005–2009
 Hallgeir Grøntvedt (born 1959), term/s: 2009–2013 and 2013–2017
 Hans Fredrik Grøvan (born 1953), term/s: 2001–2005
 Mikal Grøvan (1899–1956), term/s: 1950–1953 and 1954–1957
 Håkon Gulbrandsen (born 1969), term/s: 1989–1993
 Carl August Gulbranson (1831–1910)
 Gunnar Edvard Gundersen (1927–2017)
 Kristian Birger Gundersen (1907–1977), term/s: 1945–1949 and 1950–1953
 Mette Gundersen (born 1972), term/s: 2001–2005
 Laila Gustavsen (born 1973), term/s: 2001–2005 and 2005–2009
 Hans Guttorm (1927–2013), term/s: 1965–1969
 Ferhat Güven (born 1983), term/s: 2013–2017

H

 Christian Wegner Haaland (1892–1952), term/s: 1945–1949
 Thomas Vigner Christiansen Haaland (1859–1913), term/s: 1904–1906
 Sigmund P. Haave (1916–2001), term/s: 1965–1969
 Øyvind Håbrekke (born 1969), term/s: 1997–2001, 2001–2005 and 2005–2009
 Barbro-Lill Hætta-Jacobsen (born 1972), term/s: 2001–2005
 Geir Hafredahl (born 1962), term/s: 1989–1993
 Marcelius Haga (1882–1968)
 Ingjerd Thon Hagaseth (born 1967), term/s: 2013–2017
 Robert Hagelin (born 1884), term/s: 1931–1933
 Kåre Grøndahl Hagem (1915–2008), term/s: 1958–1961
 Gunnar Odd Hagen (1921–1997), term/s: 1969–1973 and 1973–1977
 Mari Hagen (born 1981), term/s: 2001–2005
 Per Hagen (1899–1983), term/s: 1950–1953
 Per N. Hagen (1936–2010), term/s: 1977–1981
 Sigmund Hagen (born 1976), term/s: 2001–2005
 Torstein Håland (1925–2004), term/s: 1973–1977
 Inger Haldorsen (1899–1982), term/s: 1958–1961, 1961–1965 and 1965–1969
 Egil Halmøy (1901–1984), term/s: 1961–1965
 August Herman Halvorsen (1866–1929), term/s: 1919–1921
 Carl Herman Halvorsen (1837–1918)
 Isak Halvorsen (1877– ??), term/s: 1928–1930
 Roald Halvorsen (1914–2010), term/s: 1945–1949
 Tor Halvorsen (1930–1987), term/s: 1969–1973
 Kristian Alfred Hammer (1898–1965), term/s: 1954–1957
 Andreas Hamnes (born 1941), term/s: 2005–2009
 Sigrid Brattabø Handegard (born 1963)
 David Hansen (born 1978), term/s: 1997–2001 and 2001–2005
 Even Hansen (1790–1840)
 Halvar Hansen (born 1947), term/s: 1981–1985
 Jan Henrik Nitter Hansen (1801–1879)
 Karstein Hansen (born 1932), term/s: 1997–2001 and 2001–2005
 Knut Werner Hansen (born 1951), term/s: 1997–2001, 2001–2005 and 2005–2009
 Øystein Langholm Hansen (born 1957)
 Siv Elin Hansen (born 1974), term/s: 2013–2017
 Bjarne Hanssen (1917–2014), term/s: 1973–1977
 Hans Hanssen (1853–1923), term/s: 1907–1909 and 1910–1912
 Hans Martin Hanssen (1911–1971), term/s: 1950–1953
 Kjell Hanssen (1932–2014), term/s: 1969–1973
 Christopher Hansteen (1822–1912)
 Magne Haraldstad (1937–2008), term/s: 1973–1977
 Bodolf Hareide (born 1937), term/s: 1973–1977
 Gustav Hareide (born 1950), term/s: 1989–1993 and 1997–2001
 Morten Harg (born 1955), term/s: 1981–1985
 Kåre Harila (born 1935), term/s: 1997–2001
 Wegard Harsvik (born 1967), term/s: 1989–1993
 Karl Einar Haslestad (born 1952), term/s: 1981–1985, 1997–2001 and 2001–2005
 Birger Hatlebakk (1912–1997), term/s: 1969–1973
 Roald Aga Haug (born 1972), term/s: 2009–2013
 Ivar J. Hauge (1936–2017), term/s: 1973–1977
 Einar Kristian Haugen (1905–1968), term/s: 1950–1953,1954–1957 and 1958–1961
 Rita Haugerud (1919–2014), term/s: 1965–1969
 Åshild Haugland (born 1986), term/s: 2009–2013
 Olaug Hay (1902–2000), term/s: 1954–1957
 Alvhild Hedstein (born 1966), term/s: 2005–2009 and 2009–2013
 Thomas Johannessen Heftye (1822–1886), term/s: 1880–1882
 Sissel Knutsen Hegdal (born 1965), term/s: 2009–2013 and 2013–2017
 Ola T. Heggem (born 1952), term/s: 2001–2005
 Johannes Heggland (1919–2008), term/s: 1958–1961
 Astrid Dirdal Hegrestad (1929–2014), term/s: 1969–1973, 1973–1977 and 1977–1981
 Eva Heir (born 1943), term/s: 1989–1993 and 1993–1997
 Frode Helgerud (born 1950), term/s: 1997–2001 and 2013–2017
 Gunn Marit Helgesen (born 1958), term/s: 1993–1997, 1997–2001, 2001–2005, 2005–2009, and 2009–2013
 Nils Helgheim (1903–1982), term/s: 1954–1957 and 1958–1961
 Håkon Helgøy (born 1947), term/s: 1985–1989 and 1989–1993
 Sven Helleberg (1929–1980), term/s: 1973–1977 and 1977–1971
 Magnar Hellebust (1914–2008), term/s: 1969–1973 and 1973–1977
 Andreas J. Hemma (1866–1950)
 Kai G. Henriksen (1956–2016), term/s: 1985–1989
 Kari Henriksen (born 1955), term/s: 2005–2009
 Marit Svarva Henriksen (1925–2014), term/s: 1958–1961, 1961–1965 and 1969–1973
 Martin Henriksen (born 1979), term/s: 2009–2013
 Anna Sofie Herland (1913–1990), term/s: 1958–1961 and 1961–1965
 Anne Valen Hestetun (1920–2009), term/s: 1961–1965 and 1969–1973
 Egil Hestnes (born 1943), term/s: 1989–1993 and 2001–2005
 Margaret E. Hillestad (born 1961)
 Hans Hjelle (1916–2008), term/s: 1958–1961 and 1961–1965
 Halvor Thorbjørn Hjertvik (1914–1995), term/s: 1958–1961 and 1961–1965
 Henry Olaf Hoff (1912–2011), term/s: 1954–1957
 Olaf Alfred Hoffstad (died 1943), term/s: 1919–21, 1922–24 and 1931–33
 Sigurd Høgaas (1892–1969), term/s: 1945–1949
 Ivar Hognestad (born 1956), term/s: 2005–2009
 Odd Højdahl (1921–1994), term/s: 1961–1965
 Ida Marie Holen (born 1958), term/s: 2009–2013
 Bjørn Erik Hollevik (born 1956), term/s: 2013–2017
 Andreas Holm (1906–2003), term/s: 1954–1957 and 1961–1965
 Christian Hintze Holm (born 1964), term/s: 2001–2005
 Einar Knut Holm (born 1933), term/s: 1981–1985
 Magnhild Holmberg (1943–2013), term/s: 1993–1997 and 2005–2009
 Jakob Sigurd Holmgard (1929–2013), term/s: 1977–1981 and 1981–1985
 Bjørg Holmsen (1931–2015), term/s: 1973–1977
 Amandus Holte (1888–1965)
 Thorleif Holth (1931–2014), term/s: 1961–1965
 Andreas Honerød (1905–1965), term/s: 1961–1965 and 1965–1969
 Hans Hilding Hønsvall (born 1952), term/s: 2001–2005
 Michael Peter Hopp (1787– ??), term/s: 1848–1850
 Ragna Hørbye (1861–1950)
 Hassa Horn Jr. (1873–1968), term/s: 1910–1912
 Ragnar Horn (1913–2002), term/s: 1958–1961
 Helge Høva (1928–2010), term/s: 1997–2001
 Harald Victor Hove (born 1983), term/s: 2005–2009
 Per Høybråten (1932–1990), term/s: 1973–1977
 Gudrun Tandberg Høykoll (born 1924), term/s: 1965–1969
 Finn Sture Hultgreen (born 1949), term/s: 1993–1997 and 1997–2001
 Otto Huseklepp (1892–1964), term/s: 1945–1949 and 1950–1953
 Kari Husøy (born 1952), term/s: 1993–1997
 Mani Hussaini (born 1987)
 Gunnar Hynne (born 1953), term/s: 2005–2009

I

 Georg Indrevik (born 1939), term/s: 2001–2005 and 2005–2009
 Halvard Ingebrigtsen (born 1970)
 Johnny Ingebrigtsen (born 1959), term/s: 2005–2009 and 2013–2017
 Odd Emil Ingebrigtsen (born 1964), term/s: 1989–1993
 Roger Ingebrigtsen (born 1966), term/s: 1989–1993
 Torbjørn Røe Isaksen (born 1978), term/s: 2005–2009
 Baard Iversen (1836–1920), term/s: 1892–1894
 Bjørn Iversen (born 1953), term/s: 1993–1997 and 1997–2001
 Jan Iversen (1916–1999), term/s: 1973–1977
 Turid Iversen (born 1934), term/s: 1993–1997

J

 Henrik Jahre (born 1937), term/s: 1973–1977 and 1977–1981
 Gunnar Jakobsen (1916–1992), term/s: 1958–1961
 Øistein Jakobsen (1907–1947), term/s: 1945–1949
 Nils Aage Jegstad (born 1950), term/s: 2005–2009
 Hans Jensen (1817–1888)
 Hege Jensen (born 1971), term/s: 2013–2017
 Jentoft Jensen (1901–1953), term/s: 1945–1949
 Kjell Håvard Jensen (born 1958), term/s: 2013–2017
 Anders Johansen (1929–2015), term/s: 1969–1973 and 1973–1977
 Gunda Johansen (born 1952), term/s: 2005–2009
 Johan Jentoft Johansen (1906–1973), term/s: 1937–1945 and 1958–1961
 Odd Harald Johansen (born 1982), term/s: 2005–2009
 Ole Johansen (1904–1986), term/s: 1965–1969
 Sigurd Marius Johansen (1906–1989), term/s: 1954–1957 and 1958–1961
 Jennie Johnsen (born 1977), term/s: 2005–2009
 Torhild Johnsen (born 1934), term/s: 1981–1985
 Ivar Jørgensen (1877–1956), term/s: 1913–1915, 1916–1918 and 1919–1921
 Lasse Juliussen (born 1986)

K

 Ragnar Kalheim (1926–1974), term/s: 1973–1977
 Ragnhild Aarflot Kalland (born 1960), term/s: 2001–2005 and 2005–2009
 Gretha Kant (born 1945), term/s: 2001–2005
 Pål Kårbø (born 1973), term/s: 2001–2005
 Astrid Gunhilde Karlsen (1920–2008), term/s: 1954–1957, 1973–1977 and 1977–1981
 Kåre Karlsen (1930–2009), term/s: 1973–1977
 Steinar Karlstrøm (born 1965), term/s: 2017–2021
 Ingebjørg Karmhus (1936–2009), term/s: 1989–1993
 Tollef Kilde (1853–1947), term/s: 1891–1894
 Åse Lill Kimestad (born 1955), term/s: 1989–1993, 1993–1997 and 2001–2005
 Hilda Sofie Kindt (1881–1966)
 Lars Reidulv Kirkeby-Garstad (1907–1977), term/s: 1954–1957, 1958–1961, 1961–1965 and 1965–1969
 Olav G. Kirkeluten (1904–1973), term/s: 1954–1957
 Francis Kjeldsberg (1869–1948), term/s: 1922–1924
 Ole Kristian Kjølholdt (born 1950), term/s: 1997–2001
 Egil Kjølner (1920–2010), term/s: 1969–1973 and 1973–1977
 Bjarne Kjørberg (1916–1969), term/s: 1965–1969 and 1969–1973
 Synnøve Brenden Klemetrud (born 1959), term/s: 2001–2005 and 2005–2009
 Per Kleppe (born 1923), term/s: 1954–1957
 Jenny Klinge (born 1975), term/s: 2005–2009
 Sverre Sverressøn Klingenberg (1882–1958)
 Ole Johannes Kløv (1925–2009), term/s: 1969–1973, 1973–1977 and 1977–1981
 Ole Knapp (1931–2015)
 Kai Knudsen (1903–1977), term/s: 1945–1949
 Kjell Knudsen (born 1931), term/s: 1965–1969
 Knut Andreas Knudsen (1919–2001), term/s: 1961–1965 and 1965–1969
 Eigil Knutsen (born 1988), term/s: 2013–2017
 Geir Knutsen (born 1959), term/s: 2005–2009
 Lotte Grepp Knutsen (born 1973), term/s: 2009–2013
 Martin Gunnar Knutsen (1918–2001)
 Nelly Bell Knutsen (1905–1991), term/s: 1961–1965
 Niels-Henrik Kolderup (1898–1971)
 Eva Kolstad (1918–1999), term/s: 1957–1961 and 1965–1969
 Morgan Kornmo (1925–2010)
 Knut Korsæth (born 1932)
 Mette S. Korsrud (born 1941), term/s: 2001–2005 and 2005–2009
 Johan Andreas Kraft (1808–1896)
 Kjell Thorbjørn Kristensen (1927–1995), term/s: 1958–1961 and 1961–1965
 Thorleif Kristensen (1916–1997), term/s: 1965–1969
 Adolf Kristoffersen (1891–1964), term/s: 1934–1936, 1937–1945 and 1945–1949
 Sverre Krogh (1921–2006)
 Gunvor Krogsæter (born 1933), term/s: 1981–1985
 Rangdi Krogstad (born 1966), term/s: 2001–2005 and 2013–2017
 Sigmund Kroslid (born 1947)
 Torstein Olav Kuvaas (1908–1996), term/s: 1950–1953, 1954–1957 and 1965–1969
 Berit Kvæven (born 1942), term/s: 1997–2001
 Aud Kvalbein (born 1948), term/s: 2001–2005 and 2005–2009
 David P. Kvile (1861–1918)
 Torvald Kvinlaug (1911–1997), term/s: 1961–1965, 1965–1969 and 1969–1973

L

 Ellen Lahn (1918–2004), term/s: 1973–1977
 Johan Widing Heiberg Landmark (1802–1878)
 Halvor Moxnes Landsem (1913–1977), term/s: 1954–1957 and 1958–1961
 Magne Langerud (1942–1971), term/s: 1965–1969
 Bård Langsåvold (born 1952), term/s: 2005–2009 and 2009–2013
 Arne Langset (1893–1971), term/s: 1950–1953 and 1954–1957
 Egil Oddvar Larsen (1923–2009), term/s: 1969–1973
 Gry Larsen (born 1975), term/s: 1997–2001 and 2005–2009
 Helge Solum Larsen (1969–2015), term/s: 1997–2001 and 2005–2009
 Kjell Ivar Larsen (born 1968), term/s: 2005–2009, 2009–2013 and 2013–2017
 Sigbjørn Larsen (born 1936), term/s: 1981–1985 and 1993–1997
 Thorvald Andreas Larsen (1863–1936)
 Linn Laupsa (born 1977), term/s: 2001–2005 and 2005–2009
 Stein Erik Lauvås (born 1965), term/s: 2001–2005 and 2005–2009
 Ove Lemicka (born 1961), term/s: 1989–1993 and 1993–1997
 Magne Lerheim (1929–1994), term/s: 1965–1969 and 1969–1973
 Andreas M. Lervik (born 1969), term/s: 2001–2005 and 2005–2009
 Thorbjørn Lie (1943–2006), term/s: 2005–2009
 Kristian Lien (1915–1996), term/s: 1969–1973
 Jørgen Adolf Lier (1906–1994), term/s: 1958–1961 and 1961–1965
 Asbjørn Liland (born 1936), term/s: 1965–1969
 Tone Liljeroth (born 1975), term/s: 2009–2013
 Thor Lillehovde (born 1948), term/s: 1997–2001, 2009–2013 and 2013–2017
 Bente Elin Lilleøkseth (born 1974), term/s: 2001–2005
 Kari Oftedal Lima (born 1943), term/s: 1993–1997 and 1997–2001
 Asbjørn Lindhjem (1910–1994), term/s: 1969–1973
 Johannes Lislerud (1911–1989), term/s: 1954–1957, 1958–1961 and 1961–1965
 Asbjørn Listerud (1905–1981), term/s: 1961–1965 and 1965–1969
 Sylvi Listhaug (born 1977)
 Tor Arne Bell Ljunggren (born 1962), term/s: 2013–2017
 Liv Løberg, term/s: 2001–2005 and 2009–2013
 Ebba Lodden (1913–1997), term/s: 1950–1953, 1958–1961 and 1961–1965
 Olav Lofthaug (1909–1990), term/s: 1969–1973 and 1973–1977
 Arve Lønnum Jr. (born 1961), term/s: 1993–1997
 Bjørn Lothe (1952–2009), term/s: 1997–2001, 2001–2005 and 2005–2009
 Ida Marie Løvlien (born 1974), term/s: 1997–2001
 Ole H. Løvlien (1897–1970), term/s: 1958–1961
 Hakon Lunde (1918–2005), term/s: 1989–1993 and 1997–2001
 Karl Lunde (1892–1975), term/s: 1950–1953 and 1954–1957
 Magnar Lussand (born 1945), term/s: 1997–2001
 Einar Lutro (born 1943), term/s: 2005–2009
 Ole Lysø (born 1940), term/s: 1977–1981, 1981–1985, 1985–1989 and 1989–1993

M

 Dagmar Maalstad (1902–2000), term/s: 1958–1961
 Khalid Mahmood (born 1959), term/s: 2005–2009
 Sigurd Marcussen (1905–2006), term/s: 1950–1953
 Leif Måsvær (born 1941), term/s: 1989–1993
 Per Botolf Maurseth (born 1969), term/s: 1993–1997
 Jan Birger Medhaug (born 1941), term/s: 2001–2005
 Lydolf Lind Meløy (1908–1999)
 Alfred Theodor Michelsen (1874–1941)
 Lars-Henrik Paarup Michelsen (born 1981), term/s: 2005–2009
 Bjørg Mikalsen (born 1945), term/s: 2005–2009
 William Mikkelsen (1901–1962), term/s: 1945–1949
 Olga Mistereggen (1894–1970), term/s: 1950–1953
 Nina Mjøberg (born 1964), term/s: 1989–1993, 2005–2009 and 2009–2013
 Peter Sigurd Mjør (1926–1975), term/s: 1958–1961, 1965–1969 and 1973–1977
 Geir Mo (born 1966), term/s: 1993–1997
 Bjørg Tysdal Moe (born 1954), term/s: 2005–2009
 Kristin Moe (born 1954)
 Trygve Moe (1920–1998), term/s: 1965–1969
 Olav Moen (1909–1995), term/s: 1973–1977
 Per Mohn (born 1945), term/s: 1989–1993
 Petra Mohn (1911–1996), term/s: 1961–1965
 Sigfrid Mohn (born 1930), term/s: 1977–1981 and 1981–1985
 Ivar Molde (born 1949), term/s: 1993–1997
 Camilla Mollatt (born 1971), term/s: 2013–2017
 Holm Sigvald Morgenlien (1909–1995), term/s: 1950–1953
 Albert Andreas Mørkved (1898–1990), term/s: 1958–1961
 Lorents Mørkved (1844–1924), term/s: 1910–1912, 1913–1915 and 1916–1918
 Kurt Mosbakk (born 1934), term/s: 1973–1977
 Jens Marcus Mottré (1886–1966), term/s: 1945–1949
 Hugo Munthe-Kaas (1922–2012)
 Knut Myhre (born 1931), term/s: 1969–1973
 Anders Myklebust (born 1928), term/s: 1969–1973

N

 Per Næsset (1898–1970), term/s: 1945–1949
 Eivind Nævdal-Bolstad (born 1987), term/s: 2009–2013
 Olav Steinar Namtvedt (born 1947), term/s: 1993–1997 and 2001–2005
 Johan Mjelde Natvig (1915–1998), term/s: 1965–1969 and 1969–1973
 Ivar Høsteng Neerland (1907–1978), term/s: 1958–1961
 Arnfinn Nergård (born 1952), term/s: 2005–2009
 Hege Nerland (1966–2007)
 Steinar Ness (born 1959), term/s: 1981–1985 and 1985–1989
 Harold Nicolaisen (1929–2009), term/s: 1965–1969
 Solfrid Nilsen (born 1937), term/s: 1989–1993 and 1997–2001
 Hartvig Nissen (1815–1874)
 Arnt Njargel (1901–1985), term/s: 1961–1965
 Jan Levor Njargel (born 1943), term/s: 1989–1993
 Knut H. Njøs (1883–1934)
 Olav O. Nomeland (1919–1986), term/s: 1965–1969 and 1969–1973
 Mette Nord (born 1959)
 Janne Sjelmo Nordås (born 1964), term/s: 2001–2005 and 2005–2009
 Anker Nordbø (1920–1978), term/s: 1973–1977
 Kurt Nordbø (1931–2009), term/s: 1973–1977
 Paula Nordhus (1935–1994), term/s: 1981–1985 and 1985–1989
 Jorid Holstad Nordmelan (born 1991)
 Iver G. Nordseth (born 1951), term/s: 1997–2001 and 2005–2009
 Sigurd Normann (1874–1950)
 Arvid Nyberg (born 1928), term/s: 1973–1977, 1977–1981 and 1981–1985
 Olga Nybø (born 1930), term/s: 1981–1985
 Gulborg Nygaard (1902–1991), term/s: 1954–1957

O

 Lars Ødegård (born 1956), term/s: 1993–1997, 1997–2001 and 2001–2005
 Anne Odenmarck (born 1955), term/s: 2013–2017
 Jon Øyvind Odland (born 1954), term/s: 2005–2009 and 2009–2013
 Ivar Odnes (born 1963), term/s: 2013–2017
 Lars Andreas Oftedahl
 Kjell Erik Øie (born 1960), term/s: 2005–2009
 Ingebjørg Øisang (1892–1956), term/s: 1934–1936, 1937–1945, 1950–1953 and 1954–1957
 Ole Øisang (1893–1963), term/s: 1925–1927
 Tønnes Oksefjell (1901–1976), term/s: 1945–1949
 Toralv Øksnevad (1891–1975)
 Harald Sverre Olsen (born 1921), term/s: 1969–1983
 Knut Magnus Olsen (born 1954)
 Per Arne Olsen (born 1961)
 Reidar Engell Olsen (born 1933), term/s: 1969–1973 and 1973–1977
 Sven Olsen (1922–2001), term/s: 1961–1965
 Terje Olsen (born 1951), term/s: 1993–1997 and 2009–2013
 Tom Strømstad Olsen (born 1971), term/s: 2005–2009
 Odd Omland (born 1956)
 Odvar Omland (born 1923), term/s: 1977–1981
 Christopher Frimann Omsen (1761–1829)
 Iren Opdahl (born 1974), term/s: 2013–2017
 Fredrik Ording (1870–1929), term/s: 1922–1924 and 1925–1927 he served as a deputy representative to the Parliament of Norway
 Anita Orlund (born 1964), term/s: 1997–2001, 2001–2005, 2005–2009 and 2009–2013
 Hildur Os (1913–2009), term/s: 1961–1965, 1965–1969, 1969–1973 and 1973–1977
 Anita Østby (born 1972), term/s: 2005–2009
 Sverre Østhagen (1918–1990), term/s: 1950–1935 and 1954–1957
 Per Østvold (born 1949), term/s: 1993–1997 and 2001–2005
 Terje Ottar (born 1945), term/s: 1989–1993 and 1993–1997
 Arve Hans Otterlei (born 1932), term/s: 1997–2001
 Kjell Øvergård (born 1947), term/s: 1997–2001
 Bjarne Øverhaug (1927–1996), term/s: 1969–1973 and 1973–1977
 Randi Øverland (born 1952)
 Asbjørn Øye (1902–1998), term/s: 1945–1949
 Jarmund Øyen (born 1944), term/s: 1993–1997 and 1997–2001
 Eivind Øygarden (1918–1979), term/s: 1969–1973 and 1973–1977
 Tora Øyna (1898–1991), term/s: 1958–1961 and 1961–1965

P

 Olav Paulssøn (1822–1896)
 Anne Rygh Pedersen (born 1967), term/s: 2001–2005
 Erna Mundal Pedersen (1929–2014), term/s: 1989–1993
 Herman Pedersen (1928–2009), term/s: 1965–1969
 Steinar Pedersen (born 1947), term/s: 1993–1997
 Harald Pettersen (1869–1937), term/s: 1907–1909
 Petter Pettersson Jr. (1911–1984), term/s: 1954–1957, 1961–1965, 1965–1969 and 1969–1973
 Ingrid Piltingsrud (born 1942), term/s: 1981–1985
 Ivar B. Prestbakmo (born 1968), term/s: 1993–1997 and 1997–2001
 Ingebjørg Prestegard (born 1928)
 Kari Mette Prestrud (born 1977), term/s: 2005–2009
 Torolf Prytz (1858–1938), term/s: 1900–1903

R

 Albert Raaen (1887–1971)
 Ingvill Raaum (1935–2012), term/s: 1969–1973 and 1973–1977
 Mathias Råheim (born 1951), term/s: 1997–2001 and 2001–2005
 Abid Raja (born 1975)
 Jon Ramstad (1925–2014), term/s: 1969–1973
 Einar Normann Rasmussen (1907–1975), term/s: 1954–1957 and 1958–1961
 Kari Raustein (born 1965), term/s: 2013–2017
 Sigbjørn Ravnåsen (1941–2016), term/s: 1989–1993 and 1993–1997
 Stein Reegård (born 1951), term/s: 2005–2009
 Marie Borge Refsum (born 1927), term/s: 1973–1977
 Oddvar Reiakvam (born 1985)
 Paul Reine (1932–2009), term/s: 1981–1985 and 1985–1989
 Kirsten Reitan (born 1942), term/s: 1993–1997
 Eivind Reiten (born 1953), term/s: 1985 to 1989
 Steinar Reiten (born 1963), term/s: 2001–2005 and Møre og Romsdal during the term 2009–2013
 Bernhard Riksfjord (born 1946), term/s: 1993–1997 and 1997–2001
 Johannes Rindal (born 1984), term/s: 2005–2009
 Dagfinn Ripnes (born 1939), term/s: 1997–2001
 Ingvarda Røberg (1895–1990), term/s: 1958–1961
 Ragnhild Rød (1884– ??), term/s: 1937–1945
 Torleiv Ole Rognum (born 1948), term/s: 2009–2013
 Nils A. Røhne (born 1949), term/s: 1997–2001, 2001–2005 and 2005–2009
 Anna Kristine Jahr Røine (born 1949), term/s: 1977–1981
 Anton Johan Rønneberg (1856–1922), term/s: 1904–1906
 Kristian Rønneberg (1898–1982), term/s: 1954–1957
 Kjell Ingolf Ropstad (born 1985), term/s: 2005-2009
 Anders Kristian Rørvik (1861– ??), term/s: 1907–1909
 Nils Røsholt (born 1949), term/s: 1993–1997
 Helga Rullestad (born 1949), term/s: 1997–2001 and 2001–2005
 Ove Rullestad (born 1940), term/s: 1997–2001
 Åshild Karlstrøm Rundhaug (born 1955), term/s: 1997–2001
 Ola Thorleif Ruud (born 1926), term/s: 1958–1961, 1961–1965, 1965–1969 and 1969–1973
 Øyvind Ruud (1944–2015), term/s: 1993–1997
 Roger Ryberg (born 1952), term/s: 1989–1993
 Anne Lise Ryel (born 1958), term/s: 2005–2009
 Signe Marie Stray Ryssdal (born 1924)

S

 Berge Sæberg (1923–2010), term/s: 1969–1973, 1973–1977 and 1977–1981
 Ann-Marit Sæbønes (born 1945)
 Bersvend Salbu (born 1968), term/s: 2013–2017
 Bjarne Saltnes (1934–2016), term/s: 1977–1981, 1981–1985 and 1985–1989
 O. Normann Sand (1921–1974), term/s: 1965–1969
 Bjørg Sandal (born 1955), term/s: 2005–2009
 Nils R. Sandal (born 1950), term/s: 1997–2001
 Dag Henrik Sandbakken (born 1957), term/s: 2005–2009
 Arne Nic. Sandnes (1920–1985), term/s: 1965–1969, 1969–1973 and 1973–1977
 Arne Sandnes (1925–2006), term/s: 1977–1981 and 1981–1985
 Ingebjørg Kasin Sandsdalen (1915–2003)
 Anne Helene Sandum (born 1973)
 Anne Sandum (born 1973), term/s: 2009–2013 and 2013–2017
 Liv Sandven (born 1946), term/s: 1997–2001
 Dagmar Sandvig (1921–1989), term/s: 1954–1957 and 1969–1973
 Ole K. Sara (1936–2013)
 Hermann Saue (born 1939), term/s: 1977–1981, 1981–1985 and 1985–1989
 Kirsti Saxi (born 1953), term/s: 1997–2001, 2001–2005 and 2005–2009
 Kari Schanke (1922–2006), term/s: 1965–1969
 Johan M. Schie (1863–1942)
 Ingrid Schjelderup (born 1932), term/s: 1977–1981 and 1981–1985
 Martha Schrøder (1918–2009), term/s: 1961–1965
 Britt Schultz (born 1945), term/s: 1977–1981
 Odd Sefland (born 1935), term/s: 1977–1981
 Hans Seierstad (born 1951), term/s: 2001–2005
 Johannes Seland (1912–1999), term/s: 1954–1957
 Rune Selj (born 1952), term/s: 1981–1985
 Gunnar Sethil (1872–1941), term/s: 1916–1918 and 1919–1921
 Leif Johan Sevland (born 1961), term/s: 1985–1989 and 1993–1997
 Lars Sigmundstad (born 1943), term/s: 1969–1973 and 1973–1977
 Trygve Simonsen (1937–2011), term/s: 1989–1993
 Odin Sivertsen (1914–2008), term/s: 1973–1977
 Runar Sjåstad (born 1968)
 Brynjulv Sjetne (1917–1976), term/s: 1961–1965
 Bjørn Johnny Skaar (born 1971), term/s: 1997–2001
 Arne Skaare (1907–1981), term/s: 1954–1957
 Snøfrid Skaare (born 1939), term/s: 1993–1997
 Magnus Skåden (born 1953), term/s: 1997–2001
 Gro Skartveit (born 1965), term/s: 2005–2009
 Anders Skauge (1912–2000), term/s: 1954–1957
 Edel Viola Ski (1918–2010), term/s: 1961–1965
 Martin Ski (1912–1983), term/s: 1961–1965
 Nils-Olav Skilbred (born 1949), term/s: 1997–2001, 2001–2005 and 2005–2009
 Johan Skipnes (1909–2005), term/s: 1954–1957
 Per Skjærvik (born 1953), term/s: 2005–2009
 Elsa Skjerven (1919–2005), term/s: 1965–1969, 1969–1973 and 1973–1977
 Endre Skjørestad (born 1953), term/s: 1993–1997, 1997–2001 and 2001–2005
 John Kristen Skogan (born 1942)
 Per Kristian Skulberg (born 1951), term/s: 1989–1993 and 1993–1997
 Oskar Slaaen (1907–1972), term/s: 1965–1969
 Øyvind Slåke (born 1965), term/s: 2001–2005
 Anne Kathrine Slungård (born 1964), term/s: 1997–2001, 2001–2005 and 2009–2013
 Torstein Slungård (1931–2009), term/s: 1965–1969 and 1969–1973
 Inger Smuk (born 1947), term/s: 1993–1997
 Oddbjørn Snøfugl (born 1941), term/s: 1969–1973
 Solveig Solbakken (born 1949), term/s: 1997–2001 and 2001–2005
 Synnøve Solbakken (born 1957), term/s: 2005–2009
 Eirik Lae Solberg (born 1971), term/s: 1993–1997
 Harald Solberg (born 1976), term/s: 1997–2001 and 2001–2005
 Torje Olsen Solberg (1856– ??), term/s: 1916–1918
 Torstein Tvedt Solberg (born 1985), term/s: 2009–2013
 Christian Sole (1896–1980), term/s: 1945–1949
 Greta Johanne Solfall (born 1959), term/s: 2009–2013 and 2013–2017
 Inge Solli (born 1959), term/s: 2005–2009
 Anton Sommerseth (1909–1998), term/s: 1958–1961, 1961–1965 and 1965–1969
 Nils Sønnevik (1911–1988), term/s: 1958–1961 and 1961–1965
 Gerd Søraa (born 1934), term/s: 1977–1981
 Karin Søraunet (born 1967), term/s: 2001–2005
 Ingjald Ørbeck Sørheim (1937–2010), term/s: 1969–1973
 Kari Sørheim (born 1948), term/s: 1997–2001 and 2001–2005
 Hanne Dyveke Søttar (born 1965), term/s: 2001–2005 and 2005–2009
 Terje Søviknes (born 1969)
 Olav Søyland (1921–2001), term/s: 1965–1969 and 1969–1973
 Jenny Søyseth (1922–1997), term/s: 1973–1977
 Kaare Sparby (1904–2001), term/s: 1945–1949
 Christian Sparre (1859–1940)
 Jørgen Fredrik Spørck (1787–1866)
 Charlotte Spurkeland (born 1987), term/s: 2013–2017
 Tom Staahle (born 1972), term/s: 2005–2009 and 2009–2013
 Gunnar Stålsett (born 1935), term/s: 1977–1981
 Hroar Stange (1921–2017), term/s: 1969–1973 and 1973–1977
 Anne Marie Stavnes (1918–2002)
 Martin Stavrum (born 1938), term/s: 1993–1997
 Gunnar Stavseth (born 1943), term/s: 1969–1973
 John Toralf Steffensen (1919–1996), term/s: 1973–1977
 Sigmund Steinnes (born 1959)
 Oskar Steinvik (1908–1975), term/s: 1958–1961
 Ruth Stenersen (born 1960), term/s: 1997–2001 and 2001–2005
 Asbjørn Stensaker (1885–1959), term/s: 1934–1936 and 1937–1945
 Øyvind Alfred Stensrud (1887–1956), term/s: 1945–1949, 1950–1953 and 1954–1957
 Per Espen Stoknes (born 1967), term/s: 2017–2021
 Johan Stølan (1939–2016), term/s: 1977–1981, 1981–1985 and 1985–1989
 Morten Stordalen (born 1968), term/s: 2005–2009 and 2009–2013
 Thor Støre (1924–2001), term/s: 1969–1973
 Arne Storhaug (born 1950), term/s: 2001–2005 and 2005–2009
 Haakon Storøy (1907–1977)
 André Støylen (born 1968), term/s: 1989–1993
 Morten Strand (born 1947), term/s: 2001–2005 and 2005–2009
 Olav Marensius Strandås (1900–1981), term/s: 1950–1953
 Bjarne Aagaard Strøm (1920–2008), term/s: 1965–1969
 Einar Strøm (born 1945), term/s: 2001–2005
 Frøydis Elisabeth Sund (born 1980), term/s: 2001–2005, 2005–2009 and 2009–2013
 Åslaug Linge Sunde (1917–2006), term/s: 1977–1981
 Kristian Sundtoft (1937–2015), term/s: 1965–1969, 1981–1985 and 1993–1997
 Tine Sundtoft (born 1967)
 Hans Svelland (born 1943), term/s: 1973–1977
 Ruth Svendsen (1915–1998), term/s: 1954–1957, 1958–1961, 1961–1965, 1965–1969, 1969–1973 and 1973–1977
 Sigvald Svendsen (1895–1956), term/s: 1950–1953 and 1954–1957
 Torgeir Svendsen (1910–1981), term/s: 1954–1957 and 1958–1961
 Bente Øyan Sveum (born 1945), term/s: 1989–1993, 1993–1997 and 2001–2005
 Kjell Svindland (born 1933), term/s: 1973–1977, 1977–1981, 1981–1985, 1985–1989 and 1989–1993

T

 Leo Tallaksen, term/s: 1965–1969
 Ole-Anton Teigen (born 1954), term/s: 2001–2005 and 2005–2009
 Wilhelm Thøgersen (1913–2005), term/s: 1958–1961, 1961–1965 and 1965–1969
 Olaf Thommessen (born 1966), term/s: 2005–2009
 Jørgen Olsen Thon (1866–1937)
 Johanna Thorén (1889–1969)
 Geir Thoresen (born 1965), term/s: 1993–1997
 Laila Thorsen (born 1967), term/s: 2009–2013
 Bjarne Eilif Thorvik (1908–1972), term/s: 1954–1957 and 1958–1961
 Gro Hillestad Thune (born 1943), term/s: 1977–1981
 John Thune (born 1948), term/s: 2001–2005, 2005–2009 and 2009–2013
 Nils Thune (1898–1988), term/s: 1950–1953
 Vegard Thune (born 1951), term/s: 1989–1993
 Hanne Thürmer (born 1960)
 Ole Tinghaug (born 1945), term/s: 1989–1993 and 1997–2001
 Arne Tjersland (1924–2015), term/s: 1965–1969, 1969–1973, 1969–1973
 Søren Tjønneland (1868–1954), term/s: 1916–1918
 Niclas Tokerud (born 1990), term/s: 2013–2017
 Per Tønder (1911–2015), term/s: 1954–1957, 1958–1961 and 1961–1965
 Bjarte Tørå (born 1953), term/s: 1981–1985 and 1985–1989
 Egil Toreng (1922–2015), term/s: 1958–1961
 Knut Petter Torgersen (born 1955), term/s: 2005–2009 and 2009–2013
 Rasmus Andreas Torset (1897–1965), term/s: 1958–1961
 Jon Tørset (born 1940), term/s: 1985–1989 and 1997–2001
 Åge Tovan (born 1947), term/s: 1993–1997, 1993–1997 and 2001–2005
 John Marius Trana (1898–1976), term/s: 1954–1957 and 1958–1961
 Johan Trondsen (born 1922), term/s: 1961–1965
 Synnøve Tronsvang (born 1943), term/s: 1981–1985
 Tom Tvedt (born 1968), term/s: 2005–2009

U

 Karl Ugland (1886–1966), term/s: 1950–1953
 Tor Sigbjørn Utsogn (born 1974), term/s: 2009–2013

V

 Jone Vadla (1923–2009)
 Karl Johan Pettersen Vadøy (1878–1965), term/s: 1934–1936, 1937–1945 and 1945–1949
 Arna Vågen (1905–2005), term/s: 1961–1965
 Lene Vågslid (born 1986), term/s: 2009–2013
 Martha Seim Valeur (1923–2016), term/s: 1993–1997
 Ove Vanebo (born 1983), term/s: 2005–2009
 Daniel Steen Varen (1908–1991), term/s: 1969–1973
 Ragnhild Hartmann Varmbo (1886–1982), term/s: 1937–1945 and 1945–1949
 Knut Vartdal (born 1940), term/s: 1973–1977
 Dagfinn Vårvik (born 1924), term/s: 1961–1965
 Bjarne Karsten Vatne (1926–2009), term/s: 1977–1981
 Oddbjørn Vatne (born 1948), term/s: 2001–2005 and 2005–2009
 Line Vennesland (born 1985), term/s: 2009–2013 and 2013–2017
 Jan M. Vevatne (born 1950), term/s: 1997–2001
 Hilde Vogt (born 1945), term/s: 1985–1989 and 1993–1997
 Jan Fredrik Vogt (born 1974), term/s: 2005–2009
 Ole Vollan (1837–1907), term/s: 1904–1906
 Gerd Vollum (1920–2009), term/s: 1973–1977

W

 Hjelm Waage (1866–1947), term/s: 1922–1924
 Roy Waage (born 1963), term/s: 1997–2001
 Ingebjørg Wærstad (born 1926), term/s: 1973–1977
 Elisabeth Walaas (born 1956), term/s: 1989–1993
 Erling Walderhaug (born 1942), term/s: 1989–1993
 Christopher Wand (born 1987), term/s: 2013–2017
 Eyvind W. Wang (born 1942), term/s: 1993–1997
 Signe Weisert (1923–2000), term/s: 1977–1981
 Andreas Wessel (1858–1940), term/s: 1895–1897
 Karl Valdemar Westerlund (1907–1997), term/s: 1965–1969
 Thore Westermoen (born 1949), term/s: 1989–1993, 1997–2001 and 2005–2009
 Lene Westgaard-Halle (born 1979)
 Henriette Westhrin (born 1973), term/s: 1993–1997 and 2001–2005
 Erlend Wiborg (born 1984)
 Birgit Borgersen Wiig (1928–1998)
 Ole Wiig (1923–2014), term/s: 1969–1973
 Lise Wiik (born 1947), term/s: 2001–2005, 2005–2009 and 2013–2017
 Kristian Støback Wilhelmsen (born 1991)
 Ragnvald Winjum (1917–1965), term/s: 1961–1965
 Marvin Wiseth (born 1951), term/s: 1977–1981
 Jens Wisløff (1921–1998), term/s: 1969–1973
 Hennild Wollstadmo (born 1943), term/s: 1981–1985

Y

 Ivar Ytreland (1926–2012), term/s: 1973–1977

References